Astra Bus is a bus manufacturer based in Arad, Romania. The company was established in 1996, splitting from Astra Vagoane Arad, a company specialized in manufacturing railroad cars. Since 2003, it is part of the Cefin Holding Group and their products have been buses and trolleybuses from the Irisbus range, under a partnership with the Italian company, and, on a small scale, minibuses based on Iveco, Mercedes-Benz or Volkswagen chassis.

Bus products
Astra Ikarus 415T
Irisbus Agora
Irisbus Citelis
Astra Citelis PS01T1

Other products
Volkswagen Crafter
Mercedes-Benz Sprinter
Iveco New Daily

References

External links

 Astra Bus

Bus manufacturers of Romania
Trolleybus manufacturers
Arad, Romania
Vehicle manufacturing companies established in 1996
Romanian brands
Electric vehicle manufacturers of Romania
Companies of Arad County